Kalist Rasoder was the author of the Tetraevangelion, also known as "Serres Gospel" book, written in 1354 in the Serbian recension of Church Slavonic. In view of the turbulent historical happenings in the region at the time, it is understandable how the Gospel book of Metropolitan Jakov of Serres found its way into the library of St. Paul's monastery (Agiou Pavlou) at Mount Athos, although the precise date of the transfer is unknown. The manuscript was brought to England in 1837 from the Athonite monastery of Agiou Pavlou, by Robert Curzon, 14th Baron Zouche. It was deposited at the British Museum by his son in 1876 and is kept in the British Library as Additional Manuscript 39626.

See also
Teodosije the Hilandarian (1246–1328), one of the most important Serbian writers in the Middle Ages
Elder Grigorije (fl. 1310 – 1355), builder of Saint Archangels Monastery
Antonije Bagaš (fl. 1356 – 1366), bought and restored the Agiou Pavlou monastery
Lazar the Hilandarian (fl. 1404), the first known Serbian and Russian watchmaker
Pachomius the Serb (fl. 1440s – 1484), hagiographer of the Russian Church
 Miroslav Gospel
 Gabriel the Hilandarian
 Constantine of Kostenets
 Cyprian, Metropolitan of Kiev and All Rus'
 Gregory Tsamblak
 Isaija the Monk
 Elder Siluan
 Romylos of Vidin
 Atanasije (scribe)
 Rajčin Sudić
 Dimitar of Kratovo
 Nicodemus of Tismana
 Marko Pećki
 Anonymous Athonite

References 

Medieval Serbian literature
Serbian manuscripts
12th-century biblical manuscripts
14th century in Serbia
Gospel Books
Medieval documents of Serbia
14th-century illuminated manuscripts
Cyrillic manuscripts